Warren Babe (born September 7, 1968) is a Canadian former professional ice hockey left winger. He was drafted by the Minnesota North Stars in the first round with the twelfth overall pick in the 1986 NHL Entry Draft. He would go on to play 21 games for the North Stars in the National Hockey League between 1987 and 1990; however, his career was cut short after suffering numerous concussions during his junior and professional careers.

Career statistics

Regular season and playoffs

International

External links
 

1968 births
Living people
Canadian ice hockey left wingers
Ice hockey people from Alberta
Kalamazoo Wings (1974–2000) players
Kamloops Blazers players
Lethbridge Broncos players
Minnesota North Stars draft picks
Minnesota North Stars players
National Hockey League first-round draft picks
People from the County of Forty Mile No. 8
Sportspeople from Medicine Hat
Swift Current Broncos players